Wendell Savio Coelho (born 6 June 2000) is an Indian professional footballer who plays as a midfielder for I-League club Churchill Brothers.

Career

Churchill Brothers 
Coelho signed his first senior contract with I-League side Churchill Brothers S.C. He would represent the team in 2019–20 I-League season. Coelho made his debut on 19 January 2020 against TRAU FC as a substitute for Willis Plaza during the 79th minute of the game. He was booked 1 minute after entering the pitch. The match ended 1–2 in favour of TRAU FC. Coelho only made one appearance for the club, playing for just 11 minutes in total at the end of the season.

Club statistics

Club

References

External links 

 
 
 

2000 births
Living people
Indian footballers
Churchill Brothers FC Goa players
I-League players
Association football midfielders
Footballers from Goa